Travis Thurman "Shorty" Hughes (September 17, 1922 – June 6, 2003) was an American football coach. He served as the head football coach at Stephen F. Austin State University in Nacogdoches, Texas from 1962 to 1970, compiled a record of 38–48–1. Hughes was the head football coach at Humble High School in Humble, Texas in 1949 and Deer Park High School in Deer Park, Texas from 1952 to 1960.

Head coaching record

College

References

External links
 

1922 births
2003 deaths
Stephen F. Austin Lumberjacks football coaches
High school football coaches in Texas